Transactions of the Kansas Academy of Science is a biannual peer-reviewed academic journal published by the Kansas Academy of Science. The journal covers biological and physical sciences, mathematics and computer science, history, culture, and philosophy of science, and science education. the journal is abstracted and indexed in The Zoological Record and BIOSIS Previews.

References

External links 
 

Multidisciplinary scientific journals
Publications established in 1872
English-language journals
Biannual journals
1872 establishments in Kansas
Academic journals published by learned and professional societies